Lari people may refer to:
             
Lari people (Congo) (alternatively Laari), an ethnic group of the Republic of the Congo 
Lari people (Iran), (alternatively Laristani), an ethnic group of Iran